The 1998 African Cup of Nations in Burkina Faso was the 21st edition of the Africa Cup of Nations (ACN), the national football championship of Africa, administered by the Confederation of African Football (CAF). Just like in 1996, the field of sixteen teams was split into four groups of four. Egypt won its fourth ACN championship, beating South Africa in the final 2–0.

Qualification

Participating teams 

 
 
  (hosts)
 
 
 
 
 
 
 
 
 
  (holders)

Teams excluded 

 
 
 
 
 
 

Nigeria was banned from entering the 1998 African Cup of Nations qualifying because of withdrawing from the 1996 Cup after having already qualified for the finals, while the other teams were banned for withdrawing during qualification for the 1996 Cup.

Squads

Venues

First round 
Teams highlighted in green progress to the Quarter Finals.

Group A

Group B

Group C

Group D

Knockout stage

Quarterfinals

Semifinals

Third place match

Final

Scorers 
7 goals

  Hossam Hassan
  Benni McCarthy

4 goals

  Jerry Tondelua
  Joël Tiéhi

3 goals

  Alphonse Tchami
  Souleymane Oularé

2 goals

  Paulo Silva
  Kassoum Ouédraogo
  Lokenge Mungongo
  Ibrahima Bakayoko
  Tchiressoua Guel
  Saïd Chiba
  Eliphas Shivute
  Gervatius Uri Khob
  Mehdi Ben Slimane
  Hassen Gabsi
  Ziad Tlemçani

1 goal

  Billel Dziri
  Moussa Saïb
  Lázaro
  Miguel Pereira
  Quinzinho
  Oumar Barro
  Romeo Kambou
  Sidi Napon
  Alassane Ouédraogo
  Ibrahima Tallé
  Seydou Traoré
  Joseph-Désiré Job
  Pierre Womé
  Eddy Bembuana-Keve
  Jean-Kasongo Banza
  Okitankoyi Kimoto
  Mundaba Kisombe
  Lassina Diabaté
  Ahmed Ouattara
  Ahmed Hassan
  Tarek Mostafa
  Yasser Radwan
  Mohammed Gargo
  Samuel Johnson
  Alex Nyarko
  Ahmed Bahja
  Ali Elkhattabi
  Youssef Fertout
  Mustapha Hadji
  Avelino
  Ricardo Mannetti
  Robert Nauseb
  Simon Uutoni
  Helman Mkhalele
  David Nyathi
  Komlan Assignon
  Franck Doté
  Massamasso Tchangai
  Mohamed Coubadja Touré
  Kalusha Bwalya
  Tenant Chilumba
  Rotson Kilambe
  Masauso Tembo

CAF Team of the Tournament 
Goalkeeper
  Nader El-Sayed

Defenders
  Mark Fish
  Jojo
  Noureddine Naybet
  Mohamed Emara

Midfielders
  Charles Akonnor
  Hassen Gabsi
  Tchiressoua Guel
  Didier Ekanza Simba

Forwards
  Hossam Hassan
  Benni McCarthy

External links 

 Details at RSSSF

 
African Cup of Nations, 1998
Africa Cup of Nations tournaments
African Cup Of Nations, 1998
Nations
African Cup of Nations